Thunderdome is a famous concept in hardcore techno and gabber music that was mainly used for a series of parties and CD-albums. It was organized by the Dutch entertainment company ID&T. The first party was organized in 1992 and the party held in December 2012 was advertised as being the end of Thunderdome. However, after the 2012 event, the party was brought back in 2017 for the 25th anniversary with a 2019 edition announced the following year. In 2022, Thunderdome celebrated its 30th anniversary at the Jaarbeurs convention centre, Utrecht.

History
Before the Thunderdome concept was started, ID&T organized a big rave called The Final Exam, that was held on 20 June 1992. This was the first attempt to bring hardcore and gabber to a wide audience and the first event organized by ID&T, who would later go on to organize other big dance music events such as Tomorrowland, Mysteryland, and Sensation White, and Black. Later in 1992, they organized the first Thunderdome party, which was simply titled The Thunder Dome, which was held on 3 October 1992 in Heerenveen.

In 1993, ID&T / Arcade Records also started a Thunderdome compilation CD-series with popular gabber music. ID&T also sold other kinds of merchandise such as T-shirts, bomber-jackets, caps and even an energy drink (Thundertaste). The Thunderdome concept was considered important to the popularization and spreading of gabber music during the 1990s. Though it was the biggest and most popular concept in the scene through most of the 1990s, that title is now being rivaled by other events, such as the ones organized by Masters of Hardcore.

In late 1999 ID&T took a break from the Thunderdome concept and stopped producing the parties and CDs. The break lasted until 2001, when they resumed throwing parties and producing CDs. After the restart, one or two parties each year were held. In 2002, the concept for the party was the 10th anniversary of Thunderdome. A CD that was recorded live at the party and an anniversary DVD were released, both entitled Thunderdome: a Decade. In 2007, the 3-CD set XV: 15 Years Of Thunderdome was released in celebration of Thunderdome's 15th anniversary.

The December 2012 event was advertised as being the end of Thunderdome. An anniversary compilation album was also released. A press release for this album announced that: "It all comes full circle now. It’s time to let Thunderdome become what it always has been: a legend."

On 3 November 2015, ID&T announced that while the Thunderdome concept was retired, they introduced a new similar event called "Thunderdome Die Hard Day" due to massive demand. The event took place on 5 December 2015. On 3 October 2016, the 24th anniversary of the first edition of Thunderdome, ID&T announced a second Die Hard Day event to take place on 3 December 2016 at the Warehouse Elementenstraat in Amsterdam.

At the Dominator Festival on 16 July 2016, a plane with a banner that read "25 Years of Thunderdome - See You in 2017" was seen flying over the festival grounds. The official Thunderdome Facebook page then uploaded a post that read "See you in 2017," which confirmed rumours about a 25th anniversary edition of Thunderdome. After Die Hard Day II, ID&T announced that the third edition would not happen in 2017 due to their preparations for the 25th anniversary edition of Thunderdome. Instead, Die Hard Day III was held on 27 October 2018, again at the Warehouse Elementenstraat.

On 17 February 2017, ID&T released the trailer for the 25th anniversary of Thunderdome, which took place on 28 October 2017 at Jaarbeurs Utrecht.

On 24 July 2018, a plane flew over the festival grounds at the Dominator Festival again, similar to the 2016 festival, with a banner that read "Thunderdome - See you in 2019." This was then followed up with an official trailer uploaded to Thunderdome's official YouTube channel on 30 January 2019, stating that the 2019 edition would take place at Jaarbeurs Utrecht on 26 October 2019.

On 14 October 2019, during the lead-up to the 2019 edition, Thunderdome released a trailer on their YouTube channel about an upcoming documentary titled Thunderdome Never Dies - The Full Story. The 82-minute documentary, produced in conjunction with Deep Thought Productions and 2CFilm, details the history and impact of Thunderdome, including its origins. The documentary was released in theatres in the Netherlands on 14 November 2019.

On 8 September 2021, Thunderdome released a short 10-second teaser on their official YouTube channel announcing the 2021 edition of Thunderdome, due to take place on 11 December 2021 at Jaarbeurs Utrecht. A full 1-minute trailer was released on 6 October.   This edition was subsequently postponed due to special event rules in the Netherlands following the COVID-19 pandemic. Instead, it will take place on 10 December 2022 at Jaarbeurs Utrecht, now due to celebrate the 30th anniversary of Thunderdome. An updated trailed was released on 10 August 2022.

Events

In The Netherlands

The Final Exam - 20 June 1992
Thunderdome I - Thialf in Heerenveen - 3 October 1992
Thunderdome II - Frieslandhallen in Leeuwarden - 13 February 1993
Thunderdome III - Statenhal in Den Haag - 13 March 1993
Thunderdome IV  - Thialf in Heerenveen - 3 April 1993
Thunderdome V - 'The Final Thunderdome' Martinihal in Groningen - 8 May 1993
Thunderdome - Martinihal in Groningen - 9 October 1993
Thunderdome - Jaarbeurs in Utrecht - 27 November 1993
Thunderdome Meets Multigroove - Amsterdam - 25 April 1995
Thunderdome vs. Hellraiser - Amsterdam - 26 August 1995
Thunderdome - '96 'Dance Or Die!' Fec Expo in Leeuwarden - 20 April 1996
Thunderdome @ Mysteryland - Jaarbeurs Utrecht - 22 February 1997
Thunderdome @ Mysteryland- Bussloo - 4 July 1997
Thunderdome Eastern Edition - Expo Center Hengelo - 29 November 1997
Thunderdome - Fec Expo Leeuwarden - 28 November 1998
Thunderdome - Thialf Heerenveen - 2 October 1999
Thunderdome - Heineken Music Hall Amsterdam - 25 August 2001
Thunderdome - Amsterdam RAI - 12 October 2002 [Thunderdome a Decade]
Thunderdome - Jaarbeurs Utrecht - 25 October 2003
Thunderdome - Jaarbeurs Utrecht - 4 December 2004
Thunderdome - Jaarbeurs Utrecht - 3 December 2005
Thunderdome - Jaarbeurs Utrecht - 2 December 2006
Thunderdome - Amsterdam RAI - 15 December 2007 [Thunderdome XV]
Thunderdome - Payback Time - Heineken Music Hall Amsterdam - 24 May 2008
Thunderdome - Jaarbeurs Utrecht - 20 December 2008
Thunderdome - Fight Night - Heineken Music Hall Amsterdam - 23 May 2009
Thunderdome - Alles naar de kl#te - Jaarbeurs Utrecht 19 December 2009
Thunderdome - Breaking Barriers - Jaarbeurs Utrecht - 18 December 2010
Thunderdome - Toxic Hotel - Jaarbeurs Utrecht - 17 December 2011
Thunderdome - The Final Exam - Amsterdam RAI - 15 December 2012
 Thunderdome @ Mysteryland - Floriade - Haarlemmermeer - 26 & 27 August 2017
Thunderdome 25 - Jaarbeurs Utrecht - 28 October 2017
Thunderdome - 'An ode to Gabber' Jaarbeurs Utrecht - 26 October 2019
Thunderdome - 'We Are Slaves to the Rave' Jaarbeurs Utrecht - 10 December 2022

In other countries

Thunderdome - Keulen Sporthalle Köln in Cologne, Germany - 11 July 1994
Thunderdome - Oberhausen in Revierpark in Ruhr, Germany - 13 May 1995
Thunderdome - Palau Vall D'Hebron in Barcelona, Spain - 23 June 1995
Thunderdome - Midland Railway Workshops in Perth, Australia - 1 October 1995
Thunderdome'96 Part 2 - Sportpaleis in Antwerpen, Belgium - 16 November 1996
Thunderdome'97 - Sportpaleis in Antwerpen, Belgium - 23 March 1997
Thunderdome in Italy - Number One, Corte Franca (BS), Italy - 7 September 1997
Global Hardcore Nation - Sportpaleis in Antwerpen, Belgium - 18 October 1997
Global Hardcore Nation: The Cosmic Journey - Sportpaleis in Antwerpen, Belgium - 7 February 1998
Global Hardcore Nation - Tomorrowland in Boom, Belgium - 21 July 2017

Albums
The Thunderdome CD-series began in 1993. Originally the CD-albums were released by Arcade Records. According to ID&T and Arcade "more than 1.500.000 Thunderdome albums" had been sold worldwide by 1995. In 2000 no album was released since ID&T took a break from the Thunderdome concept. From 2001 onwards the albums were released by ID&T's own record label, and from 2004 onwards by Universal In 2008 the series was handed over to Dance-Tunes.

The last Thunderdome compilation album is named "High Voltage", and was released on 2 October 2020.

In 1998 there was an attempt to launch a separate Thunderdome series in the US under the Arcade America label, but only one album was released.

Main series
Thunderdome - F*ck Mellow This Is Hardcore From Hell (1993)
Thunderdome II - Back From Hell! (Judgement Day) (1993)
Thunderdome III - The Nightmare Is Back (1993) reached number 4 in the Swiss Music Charts for compilations
Thunderdome IV - The Devil's Last Wish (1993) reached number 3 in the Austrian Music Charts for compilations and number 4 in the Swiss Music Charts for compilations
Thunderdome V - The Fifth Nightmare (1994) reached number 5 in the Austrian music charts for compilations and number 4 in the Swiss compilation charts
Thunderdome VI - From Hell To Earth (1994) reached number 9 in the Swiss compilation charts
Thunderdome VII - Injected With Poison (1994) reached number 8 in the Swiss compilation charts
Thunderdome VIII - The Devil In Disguise (1995) reached number 6 in the Swiss compilation charts
Thunderdome IX - Revenge Of The Mummy (1995) reached number 6 in the Austrian compilation charts and number 4 in the Swiss compilation charts
Thunderdome X - Sucking For Blood (1995) peaked at number 6 in the Austrian compilation charts  and number 5 in the Swiss charts 
Thunderdome XI - The Killing Playground (1995) peaked at number 7 in the Austrian compilation charts  and number 6 in the Swiss compilation charts 
Thunderdome XII - Caught In The Web Of Death (1996) peaked at number 5 in the Austrian compilation charts and number 4 in the Swiss compilation charts
Thunderdome XIII - The Joke's On You (1996) peaked at number 6 in the Swiss compilation charts
Thunderdome XIV - Death Becomes You (1996) peaked at number 8 in the Swiss compilation charts
Thunderdome XV - The Howling Nightmare (1996) Reached number 63 in the Dutch Top 100 Albums
Thunderdome XVI - The Galactic Cyberdeath (1997)
Thunderdome XVII - Messenger Of Death (1997)
Thunderdome XVIII - Psycho Silence (1997)
Thunderdome XIX - Cursed By Evil Sickness (1997)
Thunderdome XX (1998)
Thunderdome XXI (1998)
Thunderdome XXII (1998)
Thunderdome - Hardcore Rules The World (1999)
Thunderdome - Past, Present, Future (1999)
Thunderdome 2001 a.k.a. Harder Than Hard (2001)
Thunderdome 2001 Part 2 (2001)
Thunderdome 2002 (2002)
Thunderdome 2003 Part 1 (2003)
Thunderdome 2003 Part 2 (2003)
Thunderdome 2nd Gen Part 1 (2004)
Thunderdome 2005-1 (2005)
Thunderdome 2006 (2006)
Thunderdome 2007 (2007)
Thunderdome XV (2008) Highest placement in the Dutch Compilation Top 30: 5
Thunderdome (2008) Highest placement in the Dutch Compilation Top 30: 8
Thunderdome Fight Night (2009) Highest placement in the Dutch Compilation Top 30: 14
Thunderdome - Alles naar de klote (2009) Highest placement in the Dutch Compilation Top 30: 11
Thunderdome - Pure and Powerful Hardcore (2010) Highest place in the Dutch Compilation Top 30: 9
Thunderdome - Toxic Hotel (2011) Highest place in the Dutch Compilation Top 30: 8
Thunderdome - The Final Exam - 20 Years Of Hardcore (2012) Highest place in the Dutch Compilation Top 30: 3

Special CDs
Thunderdome (DREAMTEAM Productions / DURECO 1158012)
Thunderdome (TOTAL RECALL RECORDS) / Distributed by: SPV GmbH (Germany), ECHO MUSIC (Austria), TBA S.A. (Switzerland)
Thunderdome - The Megamix Of Thunderdome 1-5! (1994) reached number 5 in the Austrian Music Charts for compilations
Thunderdome - The X-mas Edition (1994)
Thunderdome - Hardcore Will Never Die (The Best Of) (1995) reached number 10 in the Swiss Music Charts for compilations
Thunderdome Australian Tour Vol 1 - Thunder Downunder (1995)
Thunderdome '96 - Dance Or Die! (Live Recorded at FEC-Expo Center Leeuwarden 20.04.96) (1996) reached number 9 in the Swiss Music Charts for compilations
Thunderdome - The Best Of (1996)
Thunderdome '97 (1997)
Thunderdome - The Best Of '97 (1997)
Thunderdome Live Presents Global Hardcore Nation (1997)
Thunderdome Live - Recorded at Mystery Land The 4th of July 1998 (1998)
Thunderdome - The Best Of '98 (1998)
Thunderdome - The Essential '92-'99 Collection (1999)
Thunderdome - A Decade Live (2002)
Thunderdome Turntablized : Mixed by Unexist (2004)
Thunderdome: Die Hard (2015)
Thunderdome: Die Hard II (2016)
Thunderdome - 25 Years of Hardcore (2017)
Thunderdome: Die Hard III (2018)
Thunderdome - An Ode to Gabber (2019)

Vinyl releases
The Dreamteam - Thunderdome (Dreamteam Productions)
Thunderdome III (Arcade)
Thunderdome - The Fuckin Megamix
DJ Dano - Thunderdome IV4 EP (Dreamteam Productions)
F. Salee - Thunderdome IV EP (Dreamteam Productions)
DJ Buzz Fuzz - Thunderdome IV4 EP (Dreamteam Productions)
The Prophet - Thunderdome IV EP (Dreamteam Productions)
The Dreamteam - Thunderdome Remix EP (Dreamteam Productions)
Thunderdome IV4 The Megamixes (Total Recall)
Thunderdome IV The Megamixes -Picture Disc- (Total Recall)
Thunderdome V The Megamixes (Total Recall)
Thunderdome VI Sampler (ID&T Records)
Thunderdome VI Megamix (ID&T Records)
Thunderdome VII Sampler (ID&T Records)
Thunderdome VII Megamix (ID&T Records)
Thunderdome Winter Experience (ID&T Records)
Thunderdome VIII Sampler (ID&T Records)
Thunderdome VIIII Sampler (ID&T Records)
Thunderdome IX Sampler (ID&T Records)
Thunderdome X Sampler (ID&T Records)
Thunderdome The Unreleased Projects (ID&T Records)
Thunderdome '96 - The Thunder Anthems (ID&T Records)
Thunderdome '98 - Hardcore Rules The World (ID&T Records)
Korsakoff - The Powerrave Experience (Stardom - Thunderdome 2004 Anthem) (Pro Artist Management)
Thunderdome 2006 (Thunderdome Records)
Promo & MC Drokz - Thunderdome 2007 Anthem / 3 Steps Ahead - Remember Remixes (The Third Movement)
DJ Mad Dog & MC Justice - Payback Time (The Official Thunderdome Anthem) (Traxtorm Records)
Endymion & Nosferatu - Act Of God (Thunderdome 08 Anthem) (Thunderdome Records)
Thunderdome Fight Night: The Thunderdome Fight Night Anthems 2009 (Thunderdome Records)

Reception
When the first Thunderdome album was re-released in 2010, Ben Martijn (a new member of Party Animals) wrote a favorable review on the FOK! website closing with the words "[the album is] full of history and indispensable in the collection of a real hardcore fan!" 

Allmusic gave Thunderdome: The Best of '98 3/5 stars.

Songs that make references to Thunderdome

Because of the popularity of the Thunderdome concept, some artists have made tributes to it in their songs. These are some examples:
3 Steps Ahead - This is the Thunderdome ("This is the Thunderdome")
3 Steps Ahead - Thunderdome till we Die ("Don't you believe we're in Thunderdome till we die")
DJ Dano - Welcome To The Thunderdome ("Welcome To Another Edition Of Thunderdome")
E-Rick & Tactic - Hardcore Rules the World ("Welcome to Thunderdome '98")
E-Rick & Tactic - Meet her at Thunderdome (Samples obviously taken from Mad Max Beyond Thunderdome because they contain the word "Thunderdome")
DJ Mad Dog And MC Justice - Payback Time ("For all the fuckers and bitches that left us behind! This is thunderdome!")
DJ Promo - Feel the Thunder ("We never stop give you what you want, we never stop give you what you need, Thunderdome, under makes me wonder, feel the bass, there will be no escape, check it, Thunderdome")
Gabbaheads - I'm a Thunderdome Baby ("I'm a Thunderdome baby, so now you can hear me")
Gabber Piet - Gabber Mack ("Shave your head down to the bone, raving at the Thunderdome")
Neophyte & Promo - TD Is You (feat. Minckz) ("Are you ready for the ultimate Thunderdome?!"/"Thunderdome is hardcore. Thunderdome is you.")
The Prophet, Gizmo, Dano & Buzz Fuzz - Thunderdome '93 ("We will take you on a trip into thunder. Thunderdome!")
Yellow Claw & The Opposites - Thunder ("Dit is Thunderdome!")
Guerrillas - Our Legacy ("This is our legacy - Thunderdome.")
Dither - To The Death ("We live, we die in the Thunderdome!")

See also

List of electronic music festivals
ID&T
Gabber music
Hardcore techno

References

External links
 The official Thunderdome website
 The official ID&T website

Music festivals established in 1992
Hardcore (electronic dance music genre)
Electronic compilation albums
1992 establishments in the Netherlands
Electronic music festivals in the Netherlands